Sunday Night Football results may refer to:

 ESPN Sunday Night Football results
 NBC Sunday Night Football results